Lepidosaphidina is a subtribe of armored scale insects.

Genera

Acanthomytilus Borchsenius, 1947
Andaspis MacGillivray, 1921
Anoplaspis Leonardi, 1898
Aonidomytilus Leonardi, 1904
Bayuraspis Takagi
Caia
Cephalaspis
Cornimytilus
Cornuaspis
Cynodontaspis
Daraspis
Dinaspis
Ductofrontaspis
Eucornuaspis
Eulepidosaphes
Fernaldanna
Fulaspis
Gynandraspis
Hexandaspis
Ischnaspis
Koroneaspis
Lapazia
Leonardaspis
Lepidosaphes
Maskellanna
Mercetaspis
Metandaspis
Mimusaspis
Mitraspis
Mytilaspis
Neopinnaspis
Nilotaspis
Niveaspis
Notandaspis
Opuntiaspis
Pallulaspis
Pandanaspis
Parainsulaspis
Paralepidosaphes
Parandaspis
Parapandanaspis
Parischnaspis
Phaulomytilus
Pinomytilus
Pistaciaspis
Santubongi
Saotomaspis
Scobinaspis
Scrupulaspis
Scytalaspis
Stramenaspis
Symeria
Takahashiella
Triraphaspis
Trischnaspis
Ungulaspis
Velataspis

References

Lepidosaphidini